Anolis biporcatus, also known as the neotropical green anole or giant green anole, is a species of anole. It is found in forests, both disturbed and undisturbed, in Mexico, Central America, Colombia and Venezuela. More southern populations, in southwestern Colombia and western Ecuador, were recognized as a separate species, A. parvauritus, in 2017.

As suggested by its common names, the neotropical green or giant green anole is mostly green in color and relatively large, among the largest anoles in the mainland of the Americas. In general, there is little sexual dimorphism in this species. The tail is roughly double the length of the snout-to-vent.

See also
List of Anolis lizards

References

Anoles
Lizards of Central America
Lizards of South America
Reptiles of Belize
Reptiles of Colombia
Reptiles of Costa Rica
Reptiles of Ecuador
Reptiles of Guatemala
Reptiles of Honduras
Reptiles of Mexico
Reptiles of Nicaragua
Reptiles of Panama
Reptiles of Venezuela
Neotropical realm fauna
Reptiles described in 1834
Taxa named by Arend Friedrich August Wiegmann